This list is about Helsingborgs IF players with at least 100 league appearances. For a list of all Helsingborgs IF players with a Wikipedia article, see :Category:Helsingborgs IF players. For the current Helsingborgs IF first-team squad, see First-team squad.

This is a list of Helsingborgs IF players with at least 100 league appearances.

Players
Matches of current players as of 27 March 2014.

References

 
Players
Helsingborgs IF
Association football player non-biographical articles